HMS Alexander was the French privateer schooner Alexandre that the British Royal Navy captured in 1796, purchased, and took into service as a ship's tender to , and later a troopship. She was the victor in two single-ship actions against opponents of equal or greater force. The Navy sold her in 1802.

Capture
On 1 April , Captain William Cayley, was escorting a convoy to the West Indies. Alexander was armed with ten guns and had a crew of 65 men under the command of M. Petre Edite. She was ten days out of Nantz. "Signior Montcalm" had been sailing from Lisbon to the  when Alexander had captured her.

Cayley decided to take Alexander with him. Six vessels ultimately shared the prize money for Alexander and the salvage money for the Portuguese vessel Nostra Signora del Monte del Carmo. The six were Invincible, Prompte, the bomb , Albacore, and Grampus.<ref>Steel (1805), pp.51-2, & p.54.</ref>

Career
Admiral Henry Harvey, commander-in-chief of the Leeward Islands Station, decided to use the captured vessel as a tender to his flagship . Different records give her name as Alexander, Alexandrian, or Alexandria.

Harvey appointed Master Peter Giles Pickernell to command Alexandria. According to a biography, he commanded her for four years. In her he spent much of his time carrying despatches for Admiral Harvey, and then later Harvey's successor Lord Hugh Seymour. However, it is also clear that there was apparently a break in his command.Alexandria and Pickerell were apparently at the capture of Trinidad (21 February 1797), the unsuccessful attack on Puerto Rico (17 April 1797).

During at least part of the second half of 1797 Alexander was under the command of Lieutenant William Wood Senhouse. Harvey sent Alexandrian out in quest of some privateers that were reported off Martinique. On 15 August 1797 she encountered the French privateer Coq of six guns and 36 men. After an engagement of three-quarters of an hour, Le Coq struck. She had lost two men killed and five wounded. That same evening Alexandrian attacked another, larger schooner. After a running fight, the French vessel escaped in the darkness.

At daylight on 4 October Alexandria was some five or six leagues west of Barbados when she sighted a schooner in pursuit of an American brig. By 9:00am Senhouse was able to bring the schooner, which proved to be the French privateer Epicharis, to action. After 50 minutes the privateer struck. Epicharis was armed with eight guns and had a crew of 74 men. Alexander lost one man killed, and four wounded, one mortally. The French had at least four men killed and 12 wounded; Senhouse believed that French casualties were greater, and based his count of 74 men on Epicharis on the number of men actually counted after she struck.

Harvey designated Pickerell an Acting Lieutenant in May 1798. During his period of command of Alexandria, she also captured several privateers. Pickerell's biographical entry gives the number as six or seven. The most important occurred on 9 October 1799 when he captured a privateer of eight guns and 70 men after an engagement that lasted three-quarters of an hour. That same day Seymour had confirmed Pickerell's appointment as a lieutenant.Alexanders subsequent career is currently obscure. She was at the capture of Suriname (20 August 1799), and at Demerara. In March 1801 the tender Alexandria supported the capture of the Danish Virgin Islands, and particularly Saint Thomas, by Lieutenant-General Thomas Trigge and Rear Admiral Sir John Thomas Duckworth. There she covered the landing of the troops. Alexander was also at Tortola on 2 April 1801.

Disposal
The Navy sold Alexander in 1802.

Notes

Citations

References
 
La Nicollière-Teijeiro, Stephane (1896) Course et les corsaires du Port de Nantes: armements, combats, prises, pirateries, etc. (Honoré Champion).
O’Byrne, William R. (1849) A naval biographical dictionary: comprising the life and services of every living officer in Her Majesty's navy, from the rank of admiral of the fleet to that of lieutenant, inclusive. (London: J. Murray).
Pérotin-Oumon, Anne (1996) "Commerce et Travail dans les Ville Coloniales des Lumieres: Basse-Terre et Pointe-à-Pitre, Guadaloupe", in François-Xavier Emmanuelli, Les Européens et les Espaces Océaniques au XVIIIe Siècle (Paris: Société française d'Histoire d'Outre Mer). 
Steel, David (1805) Steel's Prize Pay Lists; new series ... Corrected to the first of April, 1805''. (P. Steel).

1790s ships
Privateer ships of France
Captured ships
Schooners of the Royal Navy